The rusty monitor (Varanus semiremex) is a small species of monitor lizard.

It is endemic to Queensland, Australia.

The species is semiaquatic and primarily inhabits wetlands, especially mangroves, as well as the shores of islands. Its diet consists mainly of insects, fish, crabs, frogs and smaller lizards.

References

Varanus
Monitor lizards of Australia
Endemic fauna of Australia
Reptiles of Queensland
Reptiles described in 1869
Taxa named by Wilhelm Peters